The Okutadami Dam (奥只見ダム) is a concrete gravity dam on the Tadami River,  east of Uonuma on the border of Niigata and Fukushima Prefectures, Japan. The primary purpose of the dam is hydroelectric power generation and it supports a 560 MW power station which is the largest conventional hydroelectric power station in Japan. The dam also forms the second largest reservoir in Japan, next to that of the Tokuyama Dam.

Background
Construction on the dam began and its original 390 MW power station was commissioned 2 December 1960. The rest of the project was complete in 1961. Between 1999 and 2003, the power station was expanded, adding 200 MW in installed capacity. This generator has an 87 MW capacity in addition to the existing 95 MW unit, for an installed capacity of 182 MW.

36 houses were submerged.

Design
The power station is underground and located on the right bank of the river next to the dam's abutment. It consists of two caverns, one for the original power station and another adjacent for the expansion. After being received by the dam's intake, water supplied to the original power plant travels down three penstocks  in length before reaching an individual 120 MW Francis turbine-generator.

Access
 Minami Echigo Kankō Bus ( Okutadami Dam Line and Express Okutadami Dam Line )

Ginzan Daira bus stop
 For Urasa Station
 It takes to 2h35m from Tokyo Station to Urasa Station.
 It takes 1h40m from Niigata Station to Urasa Station.
 
 Aizu Bus  (Nakayama Tōge and Oze Line - No.011)

Ozeguchi bus stop
 For Oze-Oike bus stop or Numayama toge bus stop 
When passengers want to go to Aizukōgen-Ozeguchi Station you must transfer onto route bus at Numayama Tōge bus stop or Oze-Oike bus stop.
 It takes 2h40m from Asakusa Station to Aizukōgen-Ozeguchi Station, when you use Tobu Limited Express Revaty Aizu.

References

Dams in Fukushima Prefecture
Dams in Niigata Prefecture
Hydroelectric power stations in Japan
Gravity dams
Dams completed in 1961
Dams on the Tadami River
1961 establishments in Japan
Energy infrastructure completed in 1961